James C. Kennedy   (April 1862 – April 20, 1904) was a 19th-century manager in professional baseball. He managed the Brooklyn Gladiators of the American Association, considered a major league, during the  season.

Biography
Kennedy was born in New York City in April 1862; as a young man he worked for The New York Times, becoming a baseball reporter; by 1884, he was also an official scorer. He served as the secretary of the Central League, a minor league that only played one season, . Outside of baseball, Kennedy helped organize some racewalking events.

The Brooklyn Gladiators, despite the name, actually played home games at ballparks in Queens and northern Manhattan. The team, using mainly older players or players released from other teams, had a record of 26–73, a .263 winning percentage. The Gladiators did not finish the season, as they disbanded in late August and were replaced by the Baltimore Orioles.

After his brief time with the Gladiators, Kennedy became involved in staging bicycle races and boxing matches. He died in April 1904 from a heart attack, likely related to his obesity, while en route from his home in Brooklyn to Manhattan via train.

Notes

References

External links

1862 births
1904 deaths
Major League Baseball managers
Sportspeople from New York City
The New York Times sportswriters
Burials at Calvary Cemetery (Queens)